Gschütt Pass (elevation 957 m.) is a high mountain pass in the Austrian Alps between the Bundesländer of Salzburg and Upper Austria.

It connects Rußbach in the state of Salzburg with Gosau in Upper Austria. The pass is traversed by the Federal Highway B166.

See also
 List of highest paved roads in Europe
 List of mountain passes

Mountain passes of Salzburg (state)
Mountain passes of the Alps
Mountain passes of Upper Austria
Dachstein Mountains